Ebaeides palawanica is a species of longhorn beetle in the tribe Apomecynini. It was described by Breuning and Jong in 1941.

References

Ebaeides
Beetles described in 1941